Allah Baksh Sarshar 'Uqaili was a Sufi poet from the Sindh province of Pakistan.

Work
Allah Baksh published his first book, Ramooz-un-Nisa in 1920, his second in 1923, Dawat-e-Islam, in 1924 Manasik-e-Hajj and in 1929 Khalid bin Walid. During this time his poetry and articles used to appear in magazines like Al-Waheed, Sindh Madarisa magazine, Al-Hafiz al-jamia Sindh College. He wrote in Urdu for the magazine Tasawuff, published in Lahore under the pen name "Sarshar 'Uqaili".

He also served as the editor of Al-Waheed newspaper for four years. From 1942 till 1945, Uqaili served as chief Officer of District Local board in Karachi, in the same period he was the president of Rajmikal music club in Karachi and wrote a book entitled as The history of Sindhi Rag (Sindhi mystic folks).

Also, books like ilm-e-hinat ("The Study of Astronomy") appeared in his name. In 1947, when Pakistan and India separated, he was given the office of "food and livestock" in the government of Sindh and used to broadcast historical and literary speeches from Radio Pakistan, and wrote for Nai Zindagi magazine.

From 1950 to 1953, Sarshar Uqaili served as City Mayor of Karachi.

In October 1950, he founded a center for literary studies and served as its President, and served in many other such centers. His affection for Sindh poetry led him to compile a large collection of Sindhi national poems with the title Sindh Jo Tarano, which was published by the Sindh Society. In November 1955, he founded the Sindh Library in Karachi and at the same time founded the Bazm-Talib-ul-Mola academy in Hyderabad. Due to all these efforts, Makhdoom Muhammad Zaman Talib-ul-Mola declared him as his vice-regent in 1952.

After that, he ran the office of Director of Settlement Services in Hyderabad. Following his tenure at that post, he was designated as Commissioner and District Magistrate of Hyderabad and stayed as chairman of the Sindhi Adabi Board from March 1955 to September 1961.

Amongst his other contributions is that he collected his family tree. In his last days, Uqaili suffered dacoity at his house in Thatta. His personal library, with all of his writings, was stolen and many of his works were lost. Since then, much of his work is believed to have been plagiarized.

On January 15, 1971, when he was 64, the Sufi poet died and was buried in his ancestral graveyard in Thatta, leaving behind a widow, his younger brother N M Uqaili, four daughters and a son who married the granddaughter of Allama Makhdoom Muhammad Hashim Thattvi.

See also
N M Uqaili
Makhdoom Muhammad Zaman Talib-ul-Mola
Allama Makhdoom Muhammad Hashim Thattvi
Sharmila Farooqi

References

External links
 "List of Sindhi Poets
 "List of Sindhi language poets" - Science Stage

Pakistani writers
Pakistan Movement activists from Sindh
Sindhi people
Pakistani scholars
1971 deaths
1907 births
People from Thatta District
Writers from Karachi
D. J. Sindh Government Science College alumni